Morangi is a big rural area in Golaghat district of Assam situated at a distance of 12 km  of Golaghat Town. It was the headquarters of Morangi Khua Guhai during the Ahom era. 

Golaghat district